Grand Boulevard is a QLINE streetcar station in Detroit, Michigan, United States. The station opened for service on May 12, 2017, and is located in New Center.

Destinations
 Hotel St. Regis
 Cadillac Place
 Fisher Building/Fisher Theatre

Station
The station is sponsored by the Henry Ford Health System. It is heated and features security cameras and emergency phones. Passenger amenities include Wi-Fi and arrival signs.

See also

Streetcars in North America

References

Tram stops of QLine
Railway stations in the United States opened in 2017